Church of St. John the Baptist is located in the small village of Paštiky in southern Bohemia, two kilometers northeast of the town of Blatná.

History 
It was built between 1747 and 1753 on the site of a former church according to the plans of the Baroque master Kilián Ignác Dientzenhofer. The interior decoration, in the same style as the exterior of the building, is the work of the sculptor Ferdinand Ublaker and the painter J. V. Spitzer, both from the mid-18th century.

It is a single nave building with a square chancel, both richly articulated by cornices and pilasters. The nave is separated by a vaulted arch, and its termination forms a gallery with Rococo organs. The exterior walls of the church with its tower are decorated with additional massive and richly articulated cornices. Above the entrance to the churchyard are two granite sculptures of skulls, the so-called "Paštiky Death". In March 2020, they were stolen, but someone returned them to the church overnight on March 21–22, 2020.

The church is located near a cemetery, the eastern end of which is guarded by a gate adorned with stone skulls and a cup. The cemetery chapel was also built according to Dientzenhofer's plans, with a crypt located beneath it. In the mid-19th century, this chapel was modified into the family tomb of the Hildprandt family from Blatná.

The location of the church in the landscape on a high terrace with a double staircase, and its architecture from the end of Dientzenhofer's life, is a harmonious work of three prominent Baroque artists of their time.

Architectural Heritage Rescue Program 
As part of the Architectural Heritage Rescue Program between 1995 and 2014, 4,570,000 CZK was spent on the restoration of the church.

Project for the restoration of the Church of St. John the Baptist in Paštiky for the purpose of opening it to visitors 
In 2018–2019, the Church underwent reconstruction as part of a project funded by the EU and the Blatná parish (over 20 million CZK). The renovation included the roofs and facades of the buildings on the premises, stained glass windows, walls, and sidewalks, a new spire was gilded, and its 250-year-old original statues of St. Elizabeth and St. Joseph were replaced with replicas. The church contains commemorative coins and a list of local children born in 2019.

References

External links 
 

Churches in the Czech Republic